Ross Winnington Ginn (born 6 November 1942) is a former Australian politician.

He was born in Hobart, Tasmania. In 1986 he was elected to the Tasmanian Legislative Council as the independent member for Newdegate. He served as Chair of Committees from 1996 to 1998, when he resigned from politics due to ill health.

References

1942 births
Living people
Independent members of the Parliament of Tasmania
Members of the Tasmanian Legislative Council